Radium (88Ra) has no stable or nearly stable isotopes, and thus a standard atomic weight cannot be given. Radium has 33 known isotopes from 202Ra to 234Ra.

In 2013 it was discovered that the nucleus of radium-224 is pear-shaped. This was the first discovery of an asymmetrical nucleus.

List of isotopes 

|-
| 202Ra
|
| style="text-align:right" | 88
| style="text-align:right" | 114
| 202.00989(7)
| 2.6(21) ms[0.7(+33−3) ms]
|
|
| 0+
|
|-
| rowspan=2|203Ra
| rowspan=2|
| rowspan=2 style="text-align:right" | 88
| rowspan=2 style="text-align:right" | 115
| rowspan=2|203.00927(9)
| rowspan=2|4(3) ms
| α
| 199Rn
| rowspan=2|(3/2−)
| rowspan=2|
|-
| β+ (rare)
| 203Fr
|-
| rowspan=2 style="text-indent:1em" | 203mRa
| rowspan=2|
| rowspan=2 colspan="3" style="text-indent:2em" | 220(90) keV
| rowspan=2|41(17) ms
| α
| 199Rn
| rowspan=2|(13/2+)
| rowspan=2|
|-
| β+ (rare)
| 203Fr
|-
| rowspan=2|204Ra
| rowspan=2|
| rowspan=2 style="text-align:right" | 88
| rowspan=2 style="text-align:right" | 116
| rowspan=2|204.006500(17)
| rowspan=2|60(11) ms[59(+12−9) ms]
| α (99.7%)
| 200Rn
| rowspan=2|0+
| rowspan=2|
|-
| β+ (.3%)
| 204Fr
|-
| rowspan=2|205Ra
| rowspan=2|
| rowspan=2 style="text-align:right" | 88
| rowspan=2 style="text-align:right" | 117
| rowspan=2|205.00627(9)
| rowspan=2|220(40) ms[210(+60−40) ms]
| α
| 201Rn
| rowspan=2|(3/2−)
| rowspan=2|
|-
| β+ (rare)
| 205Fr
|-
| rowspan=2 style="text-indent:1em" | 205mRa
| rowspan=2|
| rowspan=2 colspan="3" style="text-indent:2em" | 310(110)# keV
| rowspan=2|180(50) ms[170(+60−40) ms]
| α
| 201Rn
| rowspan=2|(13/2+)
| rowspan=2|
|-
| IT (rare)
| 205Ra
|-
| 206Ra
|
| style="text-align:right" | 88
| style="text-align:right" | 118
| 206.003827(19)
| 0.24(2) s
| α
| 202Rn
| 0+
|
|-
| rowspan=2|207Ra
| rowspan=2|
| rowspan=2 style="text-align:right" | 88
| rowspan=2 style="text-align:right" | 119
| rowspan=2|207.00380(6)
| rowspan=2|1.3(2) s
| α (90%)
| 203Rn
| rowspan=2|(5/2−, 3/2−)
| rowspan=2|
|-
| β+ (10%)
| 207Fr
|-
| rowspan=3 style="text-indent:1em" | 207mRa
| rowspan=3|
| rowspan=3 colspan="3" style="text-indent:2em" | 560(50) keV
| rowspan=3|57(8) ms
| IT (85%)
| 207Ra
| rowspan=3|(13/2+)
| rowspan=3|
|-
| α (15%)
| 203Rn
|-
| β+ (.55%)
| 207Fr
|-
| rowspan=2|208Ra
| rowspan=2|
| rowspan=2 style="text-align:right" | 88
| rowspan=2 style="text-align:right" | 120
| rowspan=2|208.001840(17)
| rowspan=2|1.3(2) s
| α (95%)
| 204Rn
| rowspan=2|0+
| rowspan=2|
|-
| β+ (5%)
| 208Fr
|-
| style="text-indent:1em" | 208mRa
|
| colspan="3" style="text-indent:2em" | 1800(200) keV
| 270 ns
|
|
| (8+)
|
|-
| rowspan=2|209Ra
| rowspan=2|
| rowspan=2 style="text-align:right" | 88
| rowspan=2 style="text-align:right" | 121
| rowspan=2|209.00199(5)
| rowspan=2|4.6(2) s
| α (90%)
| 205Rn
| rowspan=2|5/2−
| rowspan=2|
|-
| β+ (10%)
| 209Fr
|-
| rowspan=2|210Ra
| rowspan=2|
| rowspan=2 style="text-align:right" | 88
| rowspan=2 style="text-align:right" | 122
| rowspan=2|210.000495(16)
| rowspan=2|3.7(2) s
| α (96%)
| 206Rn
| rowspan=2|0+
| rowspan=2|
|-
| β+ (4%)
| 210Fr
|-
| style="text-indent:1em" | 210mRa
|
| colspan="3" style="text-indent:2em" | 1800(200) keV
| 2.24 μs
|
|
| (8+)
|
|-
| rowspan=2|211Ra
| rowspan=2|
| rowspan=2 style="text-align:right" | 88
| rowspan=2 style="text-align:right" | 123
| rowspan=2|211.000898(28)
| rowspan=2|13(2) s
| α (97%)
| 207Rn
| rowspan=2|5/2(−)
| rowspan=2|
|-
| β+ (3%)
| 211Fr
|-
| rowspan=2|212Ra
| rowspan=2|
| rowspan=2 style="text-align:right" | 88
| rowspan=2 style="text-align:right" | 124
| rowspan=2|211.999794(12)
| rowspan=2|13.0(2) s
| α (85%)
| 208Rn
| rowspan=2|0+
| rowspan=2|
|-
| β+ (15%)
| 212Fr
|-
| style="text-indent:1em" | 212m1Ra
|
| colspan="3" style="text-indent:2em" | 1958.4(5) keV
| 10.9(4) μs
|
|
| (8)+
|
|-
| style="text-indent:1em" | 212m2Ra
|
| colspan="3" style="text-indent:2em" | 2613.4(5) keV
| 0.85(13) μs
|
|
| (11)−
|
|-
| rowspan=2|213Ra
| rowspan=2|
| rowspan=2 style="text-align:right" | 88
| rowspan=2 style="text-align:right" | 125
| rowspan=2|213.000384(22)
| rowspan=2|2.74(6) min
| α (80%)
| 209Rn
| rowspan=2|1/2−
| rowspan=2|
|-
| β+ (20%)
| 213Fr
|-
| rowspan=2 style="text-indent:1em" | 213mRa
| rowspan=2|
| rowspan=2 colspan="3" style="text-indent:2em" | 1769(6) keV
| rowspan=2|2.1(1) ms
| IT (99%)
| 213Ra
| rowspan=2|17/2−#
| rowspan=2|
|-
| α (1%)
| 209Rn
|-
| rowspan=2|214Ra
| rowspan=2|
| rowspan=2 style="text-align:right" | 88
| rowspan=2 style="text-align:right" | 126
| rowspan=2|214.000108(10)
| rowspan=2|2.46(3) s
| α (99.94%)
| 210Rn
| rowspan=2|0+
| rowspan=2|
|-
| β+ (.06%)
| 214Fr
|-
| 215Ra
|
| style="text-align:right" | 88
| style="text-align:right" | 127
| 215.002720(8)
| 1.55(7) ms
| α
| 211Rn
| (9/2+)#
|
|-
| style="text-indent:1em" | 215m1Ra
|
| colspan="3" style="text-indent:2em" | 1877.8(5) keV
| 7.1(2) μs
|
|
| (25/2+)
|
|-
| style="text-indent:1em" | 215m2Ra
|
| colspan="3" style="text-indent:2em" | 2246.9(5) keV
| 1.39(7) μs
|
|
| (29/2−)
|
|-
| style="text-indent:1em" | 215m3Ra
|
| colspan="3" style="text-indent:2em" | 3756.6(6)+X keV
| 0.555(10) μs
|
|
| (43/2−)
|
|-
| rowspan=2|216Ra
| rowspan=2|
| rowspan=2 style="text-align:right" | 88
| rowspan=2 style="text-align:right" | 128
| rowspan=2|216.003533(9)
| rowspan=2|182(10) ns
| α
| 212Rn
| rowspan=2|0+
| rowspan=2|
|-
| EC (1×10−8%)
| 216Fr
|-
| 217Ra
|
| style="text-align:right" | 88
| style="text-align:right" | 129
| 217.006320(9)
| 1.63(17) μs
| α
| 213Rn
| (9/2+)
|
|-
| rowspan=2|218Ra
| rowspan=2|
| rowspan=2 style="text-align:right" | 88
| rowspan=2 style="text-align:right" | 130
| rowspan=2|218.007140(12)
| rowspan=2|25.2(3) μs
| α
| 214Rn
| rowspan=2|0+
| rowspan=2|
|-
| β+β+ (rare)
| 218Rn
|-
| 219Ra
|
| style="text-align:right" | 88
| style="text-align:right" | 131
| 219.010085(9)
| 10(3) ms
| α
| 215Rn
| (7/2)+
|
|-
| 220Ra
|
| style="text-align:right" | 88
| style="text-align:right" | 132
| 220.011028(10)
| 17.9(14) ms
| α
| 216Rn
| 0+
|
|-
| rowspan=2|221Ra
| rowspan=2|
| rowspan=2 style="text-align:right" | 88
| rowspan=2 style="text-align:right" | 133
| rowspan=2|221.013917(5)
| rowspan=2|28(2) s
| α
| 217Rn
| rowspan=2|5/2+
| rowspan=2|Trace
|-
| CD (1.2×10−10%)
| 207Pb14C
|-
| rowspan=2|222Ra
| rowspan=2|
| rowspan=2 style="text-align:right" | 88
| rowspan=2 style="text-align:right" | 134
| rowspan=2|222.015375(5)
| rowspan=2|38.0(5) s
| α
| 218Rn
| rowspan=2|0+
| rowspan=2|
|-
| CD (3×10−8%)
| 208Pb14C
|-
| rowspan=2|223Ra
| rowspan=2|Actinium X
| rowspan=2 style="text-align:right" | 88
| rowspan=2 style="text-align:right" | 135
| rowspan=2|223.0185022(27)
| rowspan=2|11.43(5) d
| α
| 219Rn
| rowspan=2|3/2+
| rowspan=2|Trace
|-
| CD (6.4×10−8%)
| 209Pb14C
|-
| rowspan=2|224Ra
| rowspan=2|Thorium X
| rowspan=2 style="text-align:right" | 88
| rowspan=2 style="text-align:right" | 136
| rowspan=2|224.0202118(24)
| rowspan=2|3.6319(23) d
| α
| 220Rn
| rowspan=2|0+
| rowspan=2|Trace
|-
| CD (4.3×10−9%)
| 210Pb14C
|-
| 225Ra
|
| style="text-align:right" | 88
| style="text-align:right" | 137
| 225.023612(3)
| 14.9(2) d
| β−
| 225Ac
| 1/2+
| Trace
|-
| rowspan=3|226Ra
| rowspan=3|Radium
| rowspan=3 style="text-align:right" | 88
| rowspan=3 style="text-align:right" | 138
| rowspan=3|226.0254098(25)
| rowspan=3|1600(7) y
| α
| 222Rn
| rowspan=3|0+
| rowspan=3|Trace
|-
| β−β− (rare)
| 226Th
|-
| CD (2.6×10−9%)
| 212Pb14C
|-
| 227Ra
|
| style="text-align:right" | 88
| style="text-align:right" | 139
| 227.0291778(25)
| 42.2(5) min
| β−
| 227Ac
| 3/2+
|
|-
| 228Ra
| Mesothorium 1
| style="text-align:right" | 88
| style="text-align:right" | 140
| 228.0310703(26)
| 5.75(3) y
| β−
| 228Ac
| 0+
| Trace
|-
| 229Ra
|
| style="text-align:right" | 88
| style="text-align:right" | 141
| 229.034958(20)
| 4.0(2) min
| β−
| 229Ac
| 5/2(+)
|
|-
| 230Ra
|
| style="text-align:right" | 88
| style="text-align:right" | 142
| 230.037056(13)
| 93(2) min
| β−
| 230Ac
| 0+
|
|-
| 231Ra
|
| style="text-align:right" | 88
| style="text-align:right" | 143
| 231.04122(32)#
| 103(3) s
| β−
| 231Ac
| (5/2+)
|
|-
| style="text-indent:1em" | 231mRa
|
| colspan="3" style="text-indent:2em" | 66.21(9) keV
| ~53 μs
|
|
| (1/2+)
|
|-
| 232Ra
|
| style="text-align:right" | 88
| style="text-align:right" | 144
| 232.04364(30)#
| 250(50) s
| β−
| 232Ac
| 0+
|
|-
| 233Ra
|
| style="text-align:right" | 88
| style="text-align:right" | 145
| 233.04806(50)#
| 30(5) s
| β−
| 233Ac
| 1/2+#
|
|-
| 234Ra
|
| style="text-align:right" | 88
| style="text-align:right" | 146
| 234.05070(53)#
| 30(10) s
| β−
| 234Ac
| 0+
|

Actinides vs fission products

References 

 Isotope masses from:

 Isotopic compositions and standard atomic masses from:

 Half-life, spin, and isomer data selected from the following sources.

 
Radium
Radium